The Awaji class is a class of minesweepers of the Japan Maritime Self-Defense Force.

Development 
Since many naval mines are of the magnetic type, it was necessary to avoid the use of metal in the hull of minesweepers that dispose of that type, and previously, most of them were constructed of wood. By making the Awaji class FRP, the standard displacement is reduced by 30% and the life of the hull is extended, although it has almost the same dimensions as the previous wooden Yaeyama class. In the image diagram of the budget request for the 2013 government budget, stealth was improved, but in the budget request for the following 2014, the Enoshima class was enlarged.

It is one of the largest FRP ships in the world. Japan Marine United (JMU), which possesses the construction technology and equipment for large FRP vessels, handed over the third ship  to the Maritime Self-Defense Force on 16 March 2021. The Ministry of Defense and the Maritime Self-Defense Force budgeted 12.6 billion yen for the construction of the fourth Awaji-class ship following Etajima in the 2020 budget.

Ships in the class

Citations 

Ships built in Japan
 
Minesweepers of the Japan Maritime Self-Defense Force